Bereket is a village in Bor district of Niğde Province, Turkey. It is situated in the Central Anatolian plains on Turkish state highway . The population of Bereke was 188 as of 2011.

References 

Villages in Bor District, Niğde